Li Zhenshi, is a male Chinese table tennis player and coach.

Table tennis career
From 1974 to 1981, Zhenshi won several medals in singles, doubles, and team events in the Asian Table Tennis Championships and in the World Table Tennis Championships.

His nine World Championship medals included four gold medals; two in the team event and two in the doubles with Liang Geliang and Cai Zhenhua. He also won two English Open titles.

Personal life
After retiring from competitive playing, Zhenshi and his wife Zhang Li moved to the US, where they now direct the World Champions Table Tennis Academy in San Jose, California.

Zhenshi was the coach of the US men's national team which won a bronze medal at the 1995 World Team Cup. He also coached Team USA at the 1996 Olympics.

See also
 List of table tennis players
 List of World Table Tennis Championships medalists

References

Chinese male table tennis players
Living people
Asian Games medalists in table tennis
Table tennis players at the 1974 Asian Games
Table tennis players from Shanghai
Asian Games gold medalists for China
Asian Games silver medalists for China
Medalists at the 1974 Asian Games
Year of birth missing (living people)